The Ukrainian American Veterans (UAV)  is a 501(c)(19) non-profit organization of the United States, composed of Honorably Discharged Veterans of the United States Armed Forces, who are of Ukrainian heritage or descent. The UAV obtained its tax-exempt status from the IRS in 1984 and was incorporated in the State of New York in 1987. The organization is governed by a volunteer National Executive Board (NEB), headed by a National Commander, elected at a National Convention.

Purpose

Mission
In the introduction to its National Constitution, the Mission of the Ukrainian American Veterans is stated:

The UAV seeks to unite American Veterans of Ukrainian descent and is pledged to sustain the Constitution, Government and Laws of the United States.

Objectives
In Article II of its National Constitution, the following Objectives of the Ukrainian American Veterans are listed:

a) To unite, strengthen, and preserve in comradeship, all American Veterans of Ukrainian descent.

b) To perpetuate the memory and deeds of our comrades who gave their lives to secure, for us, the blessings of Liberty.

c) To foster and perpetuate our American way of life.

d) To uphold the Constitution and Laws of the United States of America.

e) To guard and defend the United States of America from all her enemies.

f) To promote a spirit of peace and goodwill amongst all the peoples on earth.

g) To preserve the principles of Justice, Liberty and Democracy for ourselves and our posterity.

h) To assist all comrades in distress as well as all the widows and orphans of our fallen comrades.

i) To maintain the Ukrainian identity in a status of high esteem and respect in these, our United States.

j) To provide scholarships to students who are descendants of or related to Ukrainian American veterans.

History

Ukrainian American Veterans Post 1 was formed in September 1921 in Philadelphia. Other posts were organized in different cities, but due to great distance and lack of numbers, a national organization did not materialize in this time period.

After World War II, a larger number of veterans emerged, new posts were formed, and interest rose in creating an organization of national scope. During the 1947 Convention of the Ukrainian Youth League of North America, several delegates met and expressed their desire to form such an association. Major Michael Darmopray (Ukrainian transliteration as Darmohray) made the preparations for Post 1 to host a National Convention at the Penn Sheraton Hotel in Philadelphia, during Memorial Day Weekend of 1948 (May 29–31, 1948).

Fifty-five delegates arrived to participate in the first National Convention, from such cities as Bayonne, N.J., Clifton, N.J., Newark, N.J., New York City, N.Y., Perth Amboy, N.J., Philadelphia, Pa., Rome, N.Y., and Troy, N.Y. The delegates discussed variations on a name for the group, and settled on Ukrainian American Veterans. A Constitution and By-Laws was adopted. A National Commander and National Executive Board were elected to lead the organization. Various resolutions were adopted, and it was decided that subsequent conventions would be held on an annual basis.

Membership eligibility requirements
Any person of Ukrainian heritage or descent shall be eligible for membership in the Ukrainian American Veterans, if such person has served in the Armed Forces of the United States and has been honorably discharged. Any person who is not of Ukrainian descent, but who meets other requirements of eligibility and is married to a person of Ukrainian descent will be eligible for full membership in the UAV.

Organizational structure

Posts
The Post is the basic unit of the UAV and usually represents a local geographic area such as a metropolitan area, city, town, or county. The Post is used for formal business such as meetings and a coordination point for local projects. Often the Post will host community events such as bingo, breakfasts, and holiday celebrations. It is also not uncommon for the Post to contain a bar open during limited hours. A Post member is distinguished by a navy blue garrison cap with gold lettering and gold piping.

State departments
The Posts are grouped together into a state level organization known as a State Department for the purposes of coordination and administration. There can be a total of 51 State Departments; one for each of the 50 states, and the District of Columbia. A State Department Commander or Department Board Officer is distinguished by a white garrison cap with blue lettering and blue piping.

National executive board
The authority of the Ukrainian American Veterans is vested in the National Executive Board (NEB), which meets quarterly or as needed, to conduct the business of the organization. The NEB is headed by a National Commander, who presides over meetings. Other NEB officers may include: Vice Commander, Adjutant, Judge Advocate, Finance Officer, Quartermaster, Chaplain, Historian, Public Relations Officer.

A National Commander is distinguished by a gold garrison cap with blue lettering and blue piping. An Officer of the National Executive Board is distinguished by a garrison cap with a blue crown and gold peak, gold lettering and gold piping.

Ladies Auxiliary
A Ladies Auxiliary to the Ukrainian American Veterans has been established. The Ukrainian American Veterans Ladies Auxiliary is a U.S.-headquartered patriotic service organization for women interested in voluntary service. It is a non-profit organization, affiliated with The Ukrainian American Veterans.

Although individual Ladies Auxiliary units existed alongside UAV Posts prior to the 1948 Convention, a National organization did not materialize until March, 1974. Rosalie Polche was elected temporary President to lead the group at that time. At the 27th UAV National Convention, in June 1974, at Jersey City, N.J., the Ladies Auxiliary was officially recognized as a part of the Ukrainian American Veterans organization. A Constitution and By-Laws was adopted the following year, in June 1975, at the National Convention in Spring Valley, N.Y.

The Ukrainian American Veterans Ladies Auxiliary is an organization with dedicated, empowered women across the country, who are devoted to America's veterans, children and youth, with the notion of inspiring Auxiliary members' communities.

Activities

Patriotic
The Ukrainian American Veterans organize and participate in various patriotic ceremonies, including: Armed Forces Day, Memorial Day, Independence Day, Veterans Day, and others. These are usually hosted at the Post level. The ceremonies may include visitation to cemeteries and marching in parades. Many individual UAV Posts have placed memorial markers or monuments in a cemetery that is centrally located for them. These monuments are the gathering place for members during Memorial Day and Veterans Day services.

Many Posts also commemorate Ukrainian Independence Day as a holiday, which was observed on January 22 in the past. After 1991, the date of observance was changed to August 24.

Representatives of UAV State Departments often participate in patriotic ceremonies, such as Proclamation signings that are sponsored by the Governor's Office or Resolution readings that are passed by the State Legislature. State Department Officers are also frequently invited to attend an annual "Governor's Review" of the State's National Guard troops.

At the National level, the UAV participated in a ceremony in Washington, D.C., on June 27, 1964, at the dedication of the Taras Shevchenko statue. Former President Dwight D. Eisenhower was present as the keynote speaker.

The UAV participated and marched in a parade in Washington, D.C., on June 24, 1976, to mark the Bicentennial of American Independence, sponsored by the Ukrainian Bicentennial Committee. A few days later, on June 27, 1976, the Ukrainian American Veterans, along with representatives of the Veterans of the First Division of the Ukrainian National Army, laid a wreath at the Tomb of the Unknown Soldier at Arlington National Cemetery. The wreath laying was preceded by a memorial service (Moleben), which was conducted jointly by Metropolitan Mstyslav Skrypnyk of the Ukrainian Orthodox Church of the USA, and Bishop Basil Losten of the Ukrainian Catholic Church. UAV National Commander Harry Polche was quoted during the ceremony:
We stand here with pride and reverence, and we pause a moment to remember all the brave men who gave their lives for this country throughout its history. They paid the supreme sacrifice for freedom, for human dignity, for everyone's hopes and dreams and rights, above all, for peace in the world. We pray that the world will achieve that peace soon.

The UAV has placed a Memorial Plaque at the USS Arizona Memorial in Pearl Harbor, Honolulu, Hawaii. Past National Commander Bohdan Bezkorowajny, accompanied by his wife Anne of the UAV Ladies Auxiliary and Past National Commander Walter Bacad, presented the plaque to the U.S. Navy in 1980. The UAV has also placed a Memorial Plaque at Arlington National Cemetery, near Washington, D.C. An additional Marker was placed at Fort Custer National Cemetery in Michigan, in 1996.

In 2005, National Commander Anna Krawczuk announced that a UAV National Monument would be built at St. Andrew's Ukrainian Orthodox Cemetery, in South Bound Brook, New Jersey. The UAV Monument would be an ideal gathering place on St. Thomas Sunday and other holidays, to remember all Ukrainian American Veterans.

Charitable
Since the creation of the Ukrainian American Veterans, one of the main activities of the group has been to work on charitable projects, such as the Welfare Fund, Scholarship Fund, and sending aid to Ukraine.

Welfare fund
After the National UAV was established, there was a desire among the membership to have a "National Welfare Fund" to assist veterans in need. The by-laws of the fund changed several times over the years; the version adopted in 1992 is the one currently in use: The purpose of the National Welfare Fund is to provide assistance in the form of grants to veteran members, their families, or a Ukrainian American Veterans Post, as aid in times of distress; also to provide gifts or grants to the Ukrainian American men or women serving in the Armed Forces of the United States.

This article provides grants to veterans who underwent major surgery, had a prolonged stay in the hospital, and were in dire need of funds. An annual fund drive is conducted by the National Welfare Officer to replenish the Welfare Fund. Post Commanders apply for a Welfare Fund grant or loan on behalf of a post member. Neither a Post Commander nor the National Welfare Officer is permitted to disclose the name of the applicant.

Scholarship fund
The 48th National Convention authorized the creation of a National Scholarship Fund and the election of a Scholarship Officer to the National Executive Board. The Scholarship Officer conducts an annual fund drive to replenish the scholarship fund, and selects a Scholarship Committee which reviews applications and awards scholarships. To be eligible for a UAV scholarship, applicants must be descendants or related to a Ukrainian American Veteran and be a full-time matriculated college student in a degree program. Undergraduate students may reapply for scholarship awards up to four times.

Aid to Ukraine
After Ukraine obtained its independence from the Soviet Union in 1991, sending aid to Ukraine became a new activity for the Ukrainian American Veterans.

Dr. Ihor Zachary of Ohio Post 24 may have been the earliest organizer of aid, when he worked with the Children of Chernobyl Relief Fund Committee in August 1992 to bring the world's largest aircraft, the AN-225 Mria, to Rickenbacker International Airport in Columbus, Ohio. The crew of the plane was on a mission to collect medicine and medical instruments for the children of Chornobyl.

In 1993, Robert Gulay of New Jersey Post 25 started the "Adopt a Hospital" project, with the assistance of NJ State Commander George A. Miziuk. The Adopt a Hospital Program involved contacting hospitals in the state, and asking them to donate their surplus medical equipment, which was then shipped to hospitals in Ukraine. Enthusiasm for the project was so great from members, that all of the posts in New Jersey participated, and the posts in surrounding states (Connecticut and New York) wanted to pitch in.

In 1993, National Commander Roman Rakowsky wrote to President Bill Clinton, voicing his concern about the U.S. Veterans Administration distribution of duplicate medical journals to Russia, but not other former Soviet republics. The result was, the U.S. Administration released duplicates of medical journals to Ohio Post 24, which shipped them to Ukraine.

From May 22 to June 1, 1995, the Armed Forces of the U.S. and Ukraine conducted joint peacekeeping exercises in the Lviv area, known as "Operation Peace Shield". The U.S. forces were assisted by Major General (ret.) Nicholas S. H. Krawciw, former commander of the 3rd Infantry Division (1987–1989), who not only translated but also acted as a facilitator between generals of both armies. About a dozen other Ukrainian-speaking military officers and NCOs accompanied the U.S. Forces as interpreters, including Spc. Yaro Rohowsky, Maj. Roman Golash, Spc. Bohdan Мак, Maj. Roman Hayda, Maj. Gregory Perchatsch, Capt. Lia Mastronardi, Spc. Peter Lysenko, Spc. Oleg Sopel and others. Having fluent linguists was essential for this mission. Since January 1995, Lt. Col. Yaro Oryshkevych M.D., D.C. Air National Guard, has been building a database of fluent Ukrainian speakers in both the active and reserve components of all branches of the service. Overall, Operation Peace Shield had 17 Ukrainian speakers and 19 Russian speakers. Many of the Ukrainian-speaking personnel were also UAV members.

In 1999, Commander Taras Szczur of New York Post 301 organized and sent aid to different Ukrainian freight ships, which were stranded in New York Harbor. The Post sent hundreds of pounds of meat, rice and other provisions to the Mikhail Stenko in April and did the same for the Banner of October in August.

Community activity
UAV members have served in various roles as community representatives and leaders.

In 1978, New Jersey Governor Brendan Byrne signed Executive Order 65, which established the Ethnic Advisory Council in the state. In 1982, Governor Tom Kean appointed Andrew Keybida of N.J. Post 17 as a Ukrainian representative and the first Ukrainian American Veteran member to serve on the Ethnic Advisory Council. Keybida would serve on the council for 10 years, well into the term of the next Governor, James J. Florio. In 1994, Governor Christine Todd-Whitman appointed George A. Miziuk of N.J. Post 25 as a Ukrainian representative on the Ethnic Advisory Council. Miziuk would serve for three years, until he moved to Florida and gave up the position.

In 1980, Pennsylvania Governor Dick Thornburgh established the Pennsylvania Heritage Affairs Advisory Commission, and appointed Past National Commander Walter "Tommy" Darmopray of Penna. Post 1 as a Ukrainian representative on the commission.

In 1991, New Jersey Commissioner of Veteran Affairs Dick Bernard (under Governor James J. Florio) invited State Commander George A. Miziuk to serve as an advisor to the N.J. State Vietnam Veterans Memorial Commission. Miziuk served for two years as an advisor. The New Jersey Vietnam Veterans Memorial was completed and unveiled in 1995. UAV N.J. Post 30 has a special marker dedicated to Major Myron F. Diduryk at the State Memorial.

In 1993, Past National Commander Roman Rakowsky of Ohio Post 24 served as a juror on a Cleveland Veterans committee to select a design for a memorial to be erected on Memorial Plaza, Cleveland Mall "A" for war casualties.

Social
In addition to its formal activities, the UAV exists as a social group where members can share camaraderie with other American veterans of Ukrainian heritage. Social activities, mainly organized at the Post level, can vary anywhere from barbecues, baseball games, and bingo, to banquets and ballroom dances.

However, social contacts have also reached beyond the members of the UAV. In 1991, Ohio Post 24 and the Lviv-based Ukrainian Veterans of Afghanistan signed a “statement of understanding” to encourage a future relationship to exchange information.

List of National Commanders

National Commanders are elected for a term of one year, and may be reelected for additional terms.
 Michael Darmopray (Honorary), Pennsylvania, Post 1, 1948
 Michael Hynda, New Jersey, Post 6, 1948–1949
 Walter Shipka, New York, Post 7, 1949–1950
 Walter T. Darmopray, Pennsylvania, Post 1, 1950–1952
 Martin Horbiowski (Horby), Pennsylvania, Post 4, 1952–1953
 Walter T. Darmopray, Pennsylvania, Post 1, 1953–1954
 Alex Pronchik, Pennsylvania, Post 1, 1954–1956
 Walter Bacad, New York, Post 7, 1956–1957
 Emil Senkow, Pennsylvania, Post 4, 1957–1959
 George Wolynetz Jr., New York, Post 7, 1959–1960
 Anthony Kutcher, Connecticut, Post 14, 1960–1961
 Matthew J. Pope, New York, Post 7, 1961–1963
 Stephen Shegda, Pennsylvania, Post 4, 1963–1965
 Walter Klawsnick, New York, Post 7, 1965–1966
 Eugene Sagasz, New Jersey, Post 17, 1966–1968
 William Michael Dubetz, New York, Post 7, 1968–1970
 Michael Wengryn, New Jersey, Post 17, 1970–1972
 William Harrison, New York, Post 19, 1972–1973
 Emrick Prestash, Connecticut, Post 15, 1973–1974
 Vasyl Luchkiw, New York, Post 19, 1974–1976
 Harry Polche, New York, Post 7, 1976–1978
 Bohdan Bezkorowajny, New York, Post 7, 1978–1980
 Michael Chaika, Connecticut, Post 15, 1980–1982
 Edward A. Zetick, Pennsylvania, Post 4, 1982–1984
 Joseph Brega, New York, Post 19, 1984–1986

 Atanas T. Kobryn, New York, Post 7, 1986–1988
 Jaroslaw Fodoryczuk, Pennsylvania, Post 18, 1988–1989
 Dmytro Bykovetz Jr., Pennsylvania, Post 4, 1989–1991
 Roman Rakowsky, Ohio, Post 24, 1991–1993
 Miroslaus Malaniak, New York, Post 23, 1993–1995
 Dmytro Bodnarczuk, New York, Post 19, 1995–1997
 Stephen Szewczuk, New York, Post 27, 1997–2000
 Mathew Koziak, New York, Post 27, 2000–2004
 Anna Krawczuk, New Jersey, Post 30, 2004–2008
 Leonid E. Kondratiuk, Massachusetts, Post 31, 2008–2012
 Ihor Hron, Florida, Post 40, 2012–present

See also
 David E. Bonior
 Jeremy Michael Boorda
 Myron F. Diduryk
 Samuel Jaskilka
 Nicholas S. H. Krawciw
 Nicholas Minue
 Jack Palance
 Roman Popadiuk
 Michael Strank

References

Further reading
 Dmytro Bodnarczuk, Ukrainian American Veterans, 1948–1998: Historical analysis and evaluation (1998), ASIN B0006RFMG4
 Anna Krawczuk, Ukrainian American Veterans, 1998–2003: registration project report (2004)
 Alexander Lushnycky, Ukrainians in Pennsylvania: a contribution to the growth of the Commonwealth (1976), ASIN B001DDBMC8
 Alex Lushnycky, Ukrainians of Greater Philadelphia (2007), 
 Myron B. Kuropas, Ukrainians of Chicagoland (2006), 
 Nancy Karen Wichar, Ukrainians of Metropolitan Detroit (2010), 
 Vsevolod Kohutiak, M.D., Fullback One Six (2000), 
 Frank Paul Senko, Wars of My Life (2005),

External links

 

American veterans' organizations
Diaspora organizations in the United States
Ukrainian American
Organizations established in 1921
Organizations established in 1948
Ukrainian diaspora organizations